Tasha Biltmore is an American actress, playwright and director. She is best known for her work on the stage plays The Conversation, The Betrayal and Roxy.

Life and career
Tasha was born in Detroit, Michigan. She is the founder of Biltmore Productions. Her stage play The Conversation is about domestic violence.

Filmography

As Actress
 2016-2017 - underPAID (TV Series)
 2013 - Vamp (TV Series)
 2012 - Damien's Quest (TV Series)
 2011 - Situations (TV Series)
As director
 2014 - A.I.M: Angry Insecure Men

References

External links 

Living people
American stage actresses
American television actresses
Year of birth missing (living people)
Actresses from Detroit
21st-century American women